Alik Cavaliere (1926 – 1998) was an Italian sculptor.  He spent his life researching the meaning of life, freedom, nature, and history.  Atheist and libertarian since generations, he didn't believe in any preconceived, final structure of the society, the environment, or the whole universe.  Neither he followed any art movements of his times, although he knew all of them and was temporarily influenced by some.  He strove along his own way, narrating his perceptions with witty irony, through sculptures made up of a wide range of materials, disposed in a chaotic labyrinth which visitors are forced to traverse without being able to find a definitive point of view.

Biography

Alik Cavaliere was born on 5 August 1926 in Rome, to Alberto Cavaliere, a southern Italian poet and politician, and Fanny Kaufman, a Russian Hebrew sculptress escaped from the revolution.

After spending part of his childhood between Rome and Paris, he settled in Milan in 1938.  In 1942, after the high school, he enrolled in Brera Academy, where he was a pupil of Francesco Messina.  There he met Giacomo Manzù, Achille Funi, Dario Fo, Bobo Piccoli, and Marino Marini, of whom he first became assistant and eventually succeeded as chair of Sculpture.

His first exhibit was in 1945, at a young artists show.  His first personal exhibition was in 1951, at Galleria Colonna of Milan.  He exposed twice at Venice Biennale, in 1964 and 1972, both times in a personal room.  He undertook teaching duty in Brera for over 30 years, eventually becoming director.  Noteworthy his retrospective held at Royal Palace of Milan in 1992, named I luoghi circostanti (Surroundings).

From 27 June to 9 September 2018 Palazzo Reale hosts another Alik Cavaliere exhibition. Entitled the green universe, the anthology focuses on the theme of nature, reconstructing the artist's journey through rendering aspects of luxuriance and suffering by representing plants.

His body is buried at Cimitero Monumentale di Milano and his name is mentioned in the Famedio (hall of fame).

Bibliography 
Mario De Micheli, Scultura italiana del dopoguerra, Schwarz Editore, Milan, 1958
Emilio Tadini, Le avventure di Gustavo B., Galleria Levi, Milan, March 1963
Guido Ballo, Alik Cavaliere, catalogo XXXII Biennale di Venezia, sala XLVII, June–September 1964
Maria Luisa Gengaro, Le mostre veneziane del Centro Internazionale delle Arti e del Costume e della XXXII Biennale, Humanitas, Brescia, 1964
Guido Ballo, La linea dell'arte italiana, Edizioni Mediterranee, Rome, 1964
Pierre Restany, Alik Cavaliere and Naturalist Determmism, Martha Jackson Gallery, New York, 2–27 November 1965
Umbro Apollonio, Gillo Dorfles, Dario Micacchi, Marcello Venturoli, Enrico Crispolti, Arte d'oggi, Curcio Editore, Rome, 1965
Enrico Crispolti, Alik Cavaliere, Galleria Schwarz, Milan, 16 May - 12 June 1967
Daniela Palazzoli, Alik Cavaliere, Haags Gemeentemuseum, June 1967
Gillo Dorfles, Alik Cavaliere, Galleria La Minima, Turin, November–December 1967
Giovanni Carandente, Dizionario della scultura, Il Saggiatore, Milan, 1967
Udo Kultermann, Nuove dimensioni della scultura, Feltrinelli, Milan, 1967
Daniela Palazzoli, Toward a Cold Poetic Image, Art International, Lugano, 1967
Henry Martin, Natura morta, Still-Life, Art and Artists, New York, 1967
Enrico Crispolti, Ricerche dopo l'informale, Officina Edizioni, Rome, 1968
Vittorio Boarini, La serra e la gabbia, in Alik Cavaliere, W la libertà, Galleria de' Foscherari, Bologna, January–February 1970
Jean Dypréau, Elements pour une confrontation et une rélation, in Alik Cavaliere, Galleria Schwarz, Milan, 6–31 May 1971
Enrico Crispolti, Omaggio all'America Latina, mostra di Alik Cavaliere e Emilio Scanavino, Galleria De Foscherari, Bologna, June 1972
Roberto Sanesi, I processi dalle storie inglesi di Shakespeare, Galleria Rizzardi, Milan, February–March 1974
Vittorio Boarini, La serra e la gabbia, Alik Cavaliere, Una mostra riproposta e Calendario, Galleria Solferino, Milan, 12 November-12 December 1975
Le Muse, Istituto Geografico de Agostini, Milan, 1975
Il Milione n. 42, Istituto Geografico de Agostini, Milan, 1975
Franco Russoli, Esperienze degli anni Sessanta, Aspetti della scultura del dopoguerra in Europa, L'Arte Moderna, Fratelli Fabbri, Milan, 1975
Arturo Schwarz, L'immaginazione alchemica, La Salamandra, Milan, 1979
Pier Luigi Tazzi, AI Nodal, Alik Cavaliere, Il Modo Italiano, Otis Art Institute of Parsons School of Design, Los Angeles, January–February 1984
Rossana Bossaglia, Alik Cavaliere, Voyage, Pinacoteca e Musei Comunali, Macerata, September 1987
Giorgio Di Genova, Storia dell'arte italiana del 900, Edizioni Bara, Ascona, 1991
Giuseppe Maria Jonghi Lavarini and Gjlla GianiArt Fence, L'arte salva l'arte. 99 opere di artisti di Brera, Rotonda della Besana and Di Baio Editore, Milan, 1992
Guido Ballo, Alik Cavaliere. I luoghi circostanti, catalogo della mostra retrospettiva a Palazzo Reale, Milan, 21 May - 5 July 1992
Marco Meneguzzo, "Alik Cavaliere, A nous la libertè!" e "Fuochi di rivolta dal 1945 al 1968" in Due secoli di scultura, Fabbri Editore, Milan, June 1995
Arturo Schwarz, La Galleria 1954-75, Mudima, Milano 1995
Roberto Sanesi, Elogio della scultura, Panicale, 3 August-10 September 1996
Loredana Parmesani, Contemporary Artists, 4th edition, St. James Press, Detroit 1996
Rossana Bossaglia e Barbara Cattaneo, Alik Cavaliere, Le Storie: I Processi, Fondazione Stelline, Milan, February 1999, ASIN B00H376PFM 
Gillo Dorfles, Angela Vettese, Arti Visive, Il Novecento, Protagonisti e movimenti, Edizioni Atlas, Bergamo, 2000, 
Arturo Schwarz, Alik Cavaliere: Poeta, filosofo, umanista e scultore, anche (quasi una biografia), Electa, Milan, 2008, 
Elena Pontiggia, Alik Cavaliere. Catalogo generale delle sculpture, Silvana Editoriale, Milan, 2011,

References

1926 births
1998 deaths
Artists from Milan
20th-century Italian sculptors
20th-century Italian male artists
Italian male sculptors
Italian contemporary artists
Modern sculptors
Academic staff of Brera Academy
Brera Academy alumni
20th-century Italian Jews